Jared or Jered ( Yereḏ, in pausa  Yāreḏ, "to descend";  Iáret;  al-Yārid), in the Book of Genesis, was a sixth-generation descendant of Adam and Eve.

Modern scholarship 

The biblical details about Jared, like the other long-lived patriarchs, are in the book of Genesis. In terms of the documentary hypothesis, the passage about the descendants of Adam (Genesis 5:1-32) is attributed to the Priestly source. A parallel passage (Genesis 4:17-22) which contains a genealogy of the descendants of Cain, is attributed to the Jahwist, another ancient version of the same original genealogy. The two genealogies contain seven similar names, and the Jahwist's version of the genealogy has Irad in the place of Jared.

Tradition 
His father Mahalalel, great-grandson of Seth, son of Adam, was 65 years old when Jared was born. In the apocryphal Book of Jubilees, his mother's name is Dinah.

Jubilees states that Jared married a woman whose name is variously spelled as Bereka, Baraka, and Barakah, and the Bible speaks of Jared having become father to other sons and daughters. Of those children, only Enoch is named specifically, born when Jared was 162 years old. Enoch went on to marry Edna, according to Jubilees, and the sole named grandchild of Jared is Enoch's son Methuselah, the longest-living human mentioned in the Bible.

Additionally, Jared was a forefather of Noah and his three sons. Jared's age was given as 962 years old when he died (when Noah was 366), making him the second-oldest person mentioned in the Hebrew Bible and the Septuagint. In the Samaritan Pentateuch, his age was 62 at fatherhood and only 847 at death, making Noah the oldest and Jared the seventh-oldest.

Islam
Jared (Yarid) is also mentioned in Islam in the Qisas Al-Anbiya, which mentions him in an identical manner.

Family tree

Allusions 
Thomas Hardy, in his novel, The Return of the Native (1878), referenced Jared as one who betokened an advanced lifetime: "The number of their years may have adequately summed up Jared, Mahalaleel, and the rest of the antediluvians, but the age of a modern man is to be measured by the intensity of his history."  (London:Folio Society) (1971 [1880] at p. 150.

See also 
 Biblical longevity

References 

Book of Genesis people
Bereshit (parashah)
Book of Jubilees